Rai (Hindi: राय; Urdu: رائے‎; Bengali: রায়, Tulu: ರಾೀ, Nepali: राई) is a historical surname in the Indian subcontinent. Etymologically the term is inherited from Sauraseni Prakrit 𑀭𑀸𑀬 (rāya), from Sanskrit राजन् (rājan). Doublet of राजा (rājā), which translates to king in Hindi. In UP this surname is used by Bhumihar Brahmins

People 
Jitendra Kumar Rai (born 1978), Cabinet Minister Bihar
 A. N. Rai (born 1955), Indian academic administrator
 Aanand L. Rai (born 1971), Indian film director and producer
 Aaron Rai (born 1995), English golfer
 Ade Rai (born 1970), Indonesian bodybuilder
 Agansing Rai (1920–2000), Nepali recipient of the Victoria Cross
 Aishwarya Rai (born 1973), Indian actress and former Miss World
 Ajay Rai, Indian politician
 Ajeet Rai (born 1999), New Zealand tennis player
 Alisha Rai (born 1996), Nepali actress, model and dancer
 Alisha Rai (author), American writer
 Alka Rai, Indian politician
 Amit Rai, Indian film director
 Amrit Rai (–1996), Indian writer
 Anand Rai (born 1977), Indian activist
 Asish Rai (born 1999), Indian footballer
 Atul Rai (born 1982), Indian politician
 Babbal Rai (born 1985), Indian Punjab singer
 Baleshwar Rai, Indian politician, former Indian Administrative Service officer
 Bali Rai (born 1971), English young-adult fiction novelist
 Béchara Boutros Raï (born 1940), Maronite Catholic Patriarch of Antioch
 Bina Rai (1931–2009), Indian actress
 Brij Mangal Rai (1914–1998), Indian freedom fighter and politician
 Daroga Prasad Rai (1922–1981), Indian politician
 Dayahang Rai (born 1979), Nepali actor
 Dipak Rai, Nepali footballer
 Gauri Shankar Rai (1924–1991), Indian politician
 Gopal Rai (born 1975), Indian politician
 Gulshan Rai (1924–2004), Indian film producer and distributor
 Guru Har Rai (1630–1661), Sikh guru
 Haqiqat Rai, Sikh martyr
 Himanshu Rai (1892–1940), Indian film pioneer
 I Gusti Ngurah Rai, National Hero of Indonesia
 Indra Bahadur Rai (1927–2018), Indian writer
 Jharkhande Rai (died 1984), Indian politician
 Kalpana Rai (1950–2008), Indian actress
 Kalpnath Rai (1941–1999), Indian politician
 Kayyar Kinhanna Rai (1915–2015), Indian writer in Kannada and activist
 Krishnanand Rai (1956–2005), Indian politician
 Kuber Nath Rai (1933–1996), Indian writer
 Kusum Rai (born 1968), Indian politician
 Lakshmi Rai (born 1989), Indian actress
 Lala Lajpat Rai (1865–1928), Indian author, freedom fighter and politician
 Lalit Rai (born 1956), Indian Army officer
 Mangla Rai (1916–1976), Indian professional wrestler
 Manikala Rai (born 1988), Nepali ultra runner
 Melina Rai, Nepali singer
 Mira Rai (born 1988), Nepali trail and sky runner
 Mona Rai, Chief Minister of Gour Kingdom
 Mridu Rai, Indian historian
 Mukrand Rai, Mughal governor
 Muthappa Rai (died 2020), Indian businessman, philanthropist and social activist
 Nandini Rai, Indian actress
 Nityanand Rai (born 1966), Indian politician
 Pamela Rai (born 1966), Canadian swimmer
 Prakash Rai (born 1965), Indian actor, director, producer and politician
 Pramila Rai (born 1963), Nepali politician
 Raghu Rai (born 1942), Indian photojournalist
 Rajiv Rai (born 1955), Indian film director and screenwriter
 Baba Ram Rai (1645–1687), Sikh founder of Ramraiya                      
 Rai Hau-min, President of the Judicial Yuan
 Ram Bahadur Rai (born 1946), Indian journalist
 Ramanna Rai (1930–2008), Indian politician
 Ramanath Rai (born 1952), Indian politician
 Ramdeo Rai (1943–2020), Indian politician
 Ramveer Rai (born 1987), Emirati cricketer
 Randeep Rai (born 1993), Indian actor
 Sabin Rai, Nepali singer
 Sara Rai (born 1956), Indian writer
 Sarita Rai, Indian politician
 Shivpujan Rai (1913–1942), Indian independence activist and politician
 Suyyash Rai (born 1989), Indian actor and singer
 Tarundeep Rai (born 1984), Indian archer
 Upendra Rai (born 1982), Indian journalist
 Vinay Rai (born 1979), Indian actor
 Vinit Rai (born 1997), Indian footballer
 Vinod Rai (born 1948), former Comptroller and Auditor General of India
 Viveki Rai (1924–2016), Indian Hindi-language writer

See also 
 Ray (surname)
 Roi (disambiguation)
 Roy

Surnames of Bhutanese origin

References

Surnames
Indian surnames
Japanese-language surnames